Western Naval Base is the current main naval base of the Armed Forces of Ukraine located in Odesa along the northwest coast of the Black Sea. It is one of two naval bases of the Ukrainian Navy along with the Azov Naval Base in Berdyansk. Until 2014, Ukraine also operated the Southern Naval Base and Main Naval Base in Sevastopol. 

The Western Naval Base was formerly a base of the Soviet Navy.

References

External links
 

Western
Buildings and structures in Odesa
Military history of the Black Sea